Babaküçə is a village and municipality in the Lerik Rayon of Azerbaijan. It has a population of 378. The municipality consists of the villages of Babaküçə and Axunahiran.

References

Populated places in Lerik District